Thrumming may refer to:

 Thrumming (textiles)
 Strumming, a musical technique